Reilly Opelka was the defending champion, but lost to Jason Jung in the quarterfinals.

Kyle Edmund won the title, defeating Andreas Seppi in the final, 7–5, 6–1.

Seeds
The top four seeds received a bye into the second round.

Draw

Finals

Top half

Bottom half

Qualifying

Seeds

Qualifiers

Qualifying draw

First qualifier

Second qualifier

Third qualifier

Fourth qualifier

References

 Main draw
 Qualifying draw

2020 ATP Tour
2020 Singles